Leuce may refer to:

Leuce (mythology), in Greek mythology, a nymph, daughter of Oceanus
Leuce (island), the Greek name of an island of the Black Sea
Leuce (titular see), a Roman Catholic titular see in Thrace
Populus sect. Leuce, an old name for the white poplar trees and aspens, see Populus section Populus